Mongolian National University of Education or MNUE (Mongolian: Монгол Улсын Боловсролын Их Сургууль) is a public university located in Ulaanbaatar, Mongolia. The university was established in 1951.

History 
Mongolian National University of Education was established in 1951 as a platform to prepare secondary education teachers. Currently the university has 12 branch education studies schools. The 1990 democratization of Mongolia is considered as a significant turning point in the history of the college.

Structure 
The university is accredited by Mongolian National Council for Education Accreditation and by ASIIN in 2018 and by ACQUIN 2021. There are 8 schools, 40 departments, 11 research centers, and 35 labs. The university offers both undergraduate and postgraduate courses. The university has 13,500 students and 900 faculty and staff.

The motto of the university is "Creative Teachers are the key to development" and the university declares its mission as— " to nurture creative and potential teachers devoted to developing every child. To prepare the finest professionals in the scientific and educational sector."

References

External links 
 

Universities in Mongolia
Educational institutions established in 1951
1951 establishments in Mongolia